Nanae Chrono, known in Japan as  is a female Japanese manga artist.  She is best known as the creator of the manga series Peacemaker Kurogane, Senki Senki Momotama, and Vassalord.

Works

Serials
 (1999)
This was a oneshot manga originally published in Shounen Gangan magazine.
 (1999)
It was licensed in English by Tokyopop.
 (2005)
This ten volume series ran in Comic Blade magazine and then in Web Comic Beat's online magazine.
 (2006)
This seven volume series ran in Comic Blade Magazine. The first four volumes have been released in English.
 (2008)
A three volume series written by Nanae Chrono but drawn by Nakabayashin Takamasa.

Artbooks
 
Peacemaker Kurogane 92pages of full color artbook. First Printed in 2004
Chrono Graffiti
A compact Illustration with  402 pages of full color. Side A features art from Senki Senki Momotama, Side B contains art from various series including Vassalord and Ilegenes. First Printed in 2008

References

External links
 Nanae Chrono's Official blog

 
1980 births
Manga artists from Tochigi Prefecture
Living people
People from Utsunomiya, Tochigi
Japanese female comics artists
Women manga artists
Female comics writers
21st-century Japanese women writers
21st-century Japanese writers